Heleen Crielaard (born 10 January 1967) is a Dutch volleyball player. She competed in the women's tournament at the 1992 Summer Olympics.

References

1967 births
Living people
Dutch women's volleyball players
Olympic volleyball players of the Netherlands
Volleyball players at the 1992 Summer Olympics
Sportspeople from 's-Hertogenbosch